Tabasco Chocolate is a spicy and sweet dark chocolate. It is made with dark chocolate and Tabasco brand dry red flavoring (red pepper). The sauce is produced in the U.S by  McIlhenny Company.

History 
Tabasco sauce was first produced in 1868 by Edmund McIlhenny, a Maryland-born former banker who moved to Louisiana around 1840. McIlhenny initially used discarded cologne bottles to distribute his sauce to family and friends. He aged red peppers for over 3 years in barrels to develop its unique flavor Tabasco uses Tabasco peppers grown in Louisiana. Over the years he created an empire brand sold in mostly every country.

Packaging 
Tabasco chocolate is packaged in a red circled tin. It contains 1.75 Oz of eight chocolate wedges. It is also sold in paint-can style cans that contain 120 separately packaged wedges.

Popularity 
Since Tabasco brand has become popular worldwide, it has taken this opportunity to create a whole new branch of Tabasco products. Additional products include T-shirts and mobile phone cases.

See also
 Tabasco sauce

References 

Chocolate